Lamberton is a town in Redwood County, Minnesota, United States. The population was 824 at the 2010 census.

History
Lamberton was platted in 1873, and named for Henry Wilson Lamberton, a railroad official. A post office has been in operation at Lamberton since 1873. Lamberton was incorporated in 1879.

Geography

Lamberton is located along U.S. Highway 14, an east–west highway that connects it to Springfield to the east and Revere to the west.

Climate

According to the Köppen Climate Classification system, Lamberton has a hot-summer humid continental climate, abbreviated "Dfa" on climate maps.

Demographics

2010 census
As of the census of 2010, there were 824 people, 366 households, and 198 families living in the city. The racial makeup of the city was 96.7% White, 0.2% Native American, 1.6% Asian, 0.5% from other races, and 1.0% from two or more races. Hispanic or Latino of any race were 1.9% of the population.

There were 366 households, of which 20.8% had children under the age of 18 living with them, 44.0% were married couples living together, 7.9% had a female householder with no husband present, 2.2% had a male householder with no wife present, and 45.9% were non-families. 42.1% of all households were made up of individuals, and 23.5% had someone living alone who was 65 years of age or older. The average household size was 2.10 and the average family size was 2.90.

The median age in the city was 50.3 years. 21% of residents were under the age of 18; 4.6% were between the ages of 18 and 24; 19.3% were from 25 to 44; 22.1% were from 45 to 64; and 33% were 65 years of age or older. The gender makeup of the city was 46.1% male and 53.9% female.

2000 census
As of the census of 2000, there were 859 people, 392 households, and 219 families living in the city. The racial makeup of the city was 99.65% White, 0.12% Native American, and 0.23% from two or more races. Hispanic or Latino of any race were 0.12% of the population.

There were 392 households, out of which 20.4% had children under the age of 18 living with them, 48.2% were married couples living together, 5.9% had a female householder with no husband present, and 43.9% were non-families. 41.3% of all households were made up of individuals, and 28.1% had someone living alone who was 65 years of age or older.  The average household size was 2.04 and the average family size was 2.79.

In the city, the population was spread out, with 20.1% under the age of 18, 4.3% from 18 to 24, 20.3% from 25 to 44, 17.6% from 45 to 64, and 37.7% who were 65 years of age or older.  The median age was 51 years. For every 100 females, there were 86.3 males.  For every 100 females age 18 and over, there were 80.1 males.

The median income for a household in the city was $28,603, and the median income for a family was $38,646. Males had a median income of $30,865 versus $20,278 for females. The per capita income for the city was $16,721.  About 12.2% of families and 14.0% of the population were below the poverty line, including 19.1% of those under age 18 and 17.0% of those age 65 or over.

References

External links

Cities in Minnesota
Cities in Redwood County, Minnesota